Saron-sur-Aube (literally Saron on Aube) is a commune in the Marne department in north-eastern France.

See also
Communes of the Marne department

References

Saronsuraube